Sibley Park is a city park located at the convergence of the Minnesota and Blue Earth Rivers in Mankato, Minnesota, United States.

The park was established in 1887 and was named for the state's first governor Henry Hastings Sibley. The park is split into two sides with a hill separating the two sides. The front side has a band shell, a petting zoo, and large lawn area. There are numerous gardens and walking trails through the park. The river side of the park has a view of the river along with sledding hills during the winter, and softball fields and tennis courts during the summer months. There are also a playground and barbecue pits.

History
The park stands on the site of a defining incident of the Sioux Uprising of 1862, in which then Colonel Henry Sibley (after whom the park is named), condemned 303 voluntarily surrendered Sioux men to death by hanging following a series of cursory sham trials, after personal written assurances from Sibley to treat fairly those who had presented themselves under a white flag. Abraham Lincoln personally requested the hanging be delayed until the cases could be reviewed, but under pressure from advisors, he summarily decided that only rapists should be hanged. As there were only 2 identified cases of rape among the 303, which would not satisfy the desire for retribution of the settlers, Lincoln reviewed the cases and personally drew up a list of 38 Sioux, who were hanged in downtown Mankato.

Traditions
Every year Kiwanis International hosts a nightly Holiday Lights event from the end of November to the end of December. The mission of Kiwanis Holiday Lights is to create a celebration of Holiday Lights for the Greater Mankato Area that builds on past traditions and promotes the communities they serve, while raising non-perishable food donations for those in need. Sibley Park hosts the event every year since 2012.

References

 Online Highway

External links
 Sibley Park

Regional parks in Minnesota
Protected areas of Blue Earth County, Minnesota
Mankato, Minnesota
1887 establishments in Minnesota
Protected areas established in 1887